1F Hecho Realidad Tour was the fifth concert tour by American group Ha*Ash. The tour was supporting her first live album Primera Fila: Hecho Realidad. The tour visited South America, North America and Europe starting on  April  25, 2015.

Opening acts 

 José Cantoral.
 Mando.
 María José Castillo.

Special guests 

 Axel –  April  3, 2015 and  November  12, 2015: "No Te Quiero Nada".
 Moderrato –  June  21, 2015: "Ya Lo Veía Venir".
 Matisse –  June  21, 2015 and  November  26, 2016: "Sé Que Te Vas".
 Joy Huerta –  October  25, 2015: "" and "No Tiene Devolución".
 Reik –   November  26, 2016: "Creo en Ti" and  "¿Qué Haré Con Este Amor?".
 Alicia Villarreal –   November  26, 2016: "Te Aprovechas", "Ex de Verdad" and "Ay Papacito".

Set list 
This is the setlist for the show at the Auditorio Telmex in Guadalajara, México on September 10, 2016. It is not representative of every show on the tour.

 Soy Mujer
 Amor a Medias
 ¿De Dónde Sacas Eso?
 Dos Copas de Más
 Todo No Fue Suficiente
 Me Entrego a Ti
 Lo Aprendí de Ti
 ¿Qué Haré Con Este Amor?
 Te Quedaste
 Si Pruebas una Vez
 Tú y Yo Volvemos al Amor (Mónica Naranjo cover)
 Ex de Verdad
 ¿Qué Hago Yo?
 Impermeable
 Sé Que Te Vas
 Te Dejo en Libertad
 No Te Quiero Nada
Encore 1
 Odio Amarte
Encore 2
 Perdón, Perdón
 Estés Donde Estés

Tour dates

References

External links 

 Official site.

Ha*Ash concert tours
2015 concert tours
2016 concert tours
2017 concert tours
Concert tours of South America
Concert tours of Europe
Concert tours of North America